The 1924 North Texas State Teachers Eagles football team was an American football team that represented the North Texas State Teachers College (now known as the University of North Texas) during the 1924 college football season as a member of the Texas Intercollegiate Athletic Association (TIAA). In their fifth year under head coach Theron J. Fouts, the team compiled an overall record of 5–3–1 with a mark of 4–1–1 in conference play, placing second in the TIAA.

Schedule

References

North Texas State Teachers
North Texas Mean Green football seasons
North Texas State Teachers Eagles football